Mabel Gay Tamayo (born 5 May 1983 in Santiago de Cuba) is a Cuban triple jumper.

Her personal best jump is 14.67 metres, achieved in September 2011 in Daegu.

Personal bests
Outdoor
Long jump: 6.28 m –  Rio de Janeiro, 17 May 2009
Triple jump: 14.67 m –  Daegu, 1 September 2011
Indoor
Triple jump: 14.57 m –  Budapest, 5 March 2004

Achievements

References

External links

Ecured biography (in Spanish)

1983 births
Living people
Sportspeople from Santiago de Cuba
Cuban female triple jumpers
Athletes (track and field) at the 2003 Pan American Games
Athletes (track and field) at the 2007 Pan American Games
Athletes (track and field) at the 2008 Summer Olympics
Athletes (track and field) at the 2011 Pan American Games
Olympic athletes of Cuba
World Athletics Championships medalists
Pan American Games bronze medalists for Cuba
Pan American Games medalists in athletics (track and field)
Central American and Caribbean Games gold medalists for Cuba
Competitors at the 2006 Central American and Caribbean Games
IAAF World Athletics Final winners
Central American and Caribbean Games medalists in athletics
Medalists at the 2003 Pan American Games
Medalists at the 2007 Pan American Games
Medalists at the 2011 Pan American Games